Bexell may refer to
Bexell (surname)
Bexell Cottage in Sweden
John Bexell House in Oregon, United States